Detelin Dimitrov (born 17 January 1983) is a Bulgarian footballer who currently plays as a defender for German club TSV Grabenstätt.

External links
  Profile

Bulgarian footballers
Living people
1983 births
PFC Dobrudzha Dobrich players
PFC Cherno More Varna players
PFC Kaliakra Kavarna players
First Professional Football League (Bulgaria) players
Second Professional Football League (Bulgaria) players
Association football defenders
People from Dobrich